A by-election was held for the New South Wales Legislative Assembly electorate of Queanbeyan on 27 January 1881. The election was triggered by the resignation of James Thompson, taking up the government position of Railway Land Valuator.

Dates

Candidates

 John Gale was the publisher of a local paper, The Queanbeyan Age.

 Percy Hodgkinson was a surveyor, land agent and auctioneer in Queanbeyan, who was an unsuccessful candidate at the 1880 election.

 Thomas Rutledge was a pastoralist who was an unsuccessful candidate at the 1877 election.

Result

James Thompson resigned.

See also
Electoral results for the district of Queanbeyan
List of New South Wales state by-elections

References

1881 elections in Australia
New South Wales state by-elections
1880s in New South Wales